Alexander G. Clifford (1909 – 1952) was a British journalist and author, best known as a war correspondent during World War II.

Life
Clifford was educated at Charterhouse School and Balliol College, Oxford. He married the actress and journalist Jennie Prydie Nicholson (1919–1964) on 22 February 1945 in the Savoy Chapel, London; she was the eldest child of poet and author Robert Graves and Annie Mary Prydie "Nancy" Nicholson, elder daughter of the painter William Nicholson. Clifford died in 1952 and is buried on the headland near Portofino, Italy.

World War II
Clifford was a war correspondent for the Daily Mail during the war. In June 1940 the Sunderland flying ship in which he was being transported beached near Malta to avoid sinking.

Clifford was a friend of Daily Express correspondent Alan Moorehead; they both covered the Spanish Civil War, and first met in the 'Bar Basque' in Saint-Jean-de-Luz in 1938). Moorehead wrote much about him in his three books on the North African Campaign. They spent much of the war in each other's company during the Desert War, the Allied invasion of Italy and the Invasion of Normandy. According to one writer, "Moorehead and Clifford were complementary opposites, professional rivals as well as friends. Clifford was an intellectual European and a profound pessimist, uncertain of himself and the world. The expatriate Moorehead was driven by his curiosity, brilliance and eagerness to discover the world." Moorehead's memoir A Late Education: Episodes in a Life is, amongst other things, the story of his friendship with Clifford. Richard Knott's book The Trio (2015) is an account of Clifford's work as a war correspondent and his friendship with Alan Moorehead and Christopher Buckley.

Books by Clifford
Crusader, G. G. Harrap, London, 1942
Three against Rommel. The Campaigns of Wavell, Auchinleck and Alexander, G. G. Harrap, London, 1943
The Sickle and the Stars (with Jennie Nicholson), P. Davies, London, 1948
Enter Citizens, Evans Bros, London, 1950
The Conquest of North Africa 1940 to 1943, Kessinger, 2007

Notes

References

External links
Text of The Conquest of North Africa 1940 to 1943

1909 births
1952 deaths
Alumni of Balliol College, Oxford
British male journalists
British non-fiction writers
Daily Mail journalists
People educated at Charterhouse School
British war correspondents
20th-century non-fiction writers
Graves family